A chief of police is the title given to an appointed official or an elected one in the chain of command of a police department, particularly in North America. A chief of police may also be known as a police chief or sometimes just a chief, while some countries favour other titles such as commissioner or chief constable. A police chief is appointed by and answerable to a national or local government.

Duties 
The precise role of a chief of police varies by country and sometimes within a country. The larger a police force or department, the more likely that some duties will be delegated to mid-ranked officers. The following list is a general sense of the actions and responsibilities held by any chief of police.

 Oversight of a department's operations and budgeting
 Oversight of officers
 Limited disciplinary actions to be addressed on infractions of policy, rules, regulations, laws or ordinances
 Full dismissal or heavy sanctioning of officer duty; these powers vary by department
 Promotion and rank placement of officers
 Production and development of department policies and regulations
 Liaison with the governments that oversee and fund the department
 In small police departments, upkeep and updating of department equipment such as police vehicles, weapons, communications equipment and uniforms
 In the smallest police departments, the chief may also carry out the same duties as regular officers (patrol, investigations, etc.)

Police chiefs are usually sworn police officers, and therefore wear police uniforms and have the power of arrest, though there are exceptions. In practice, their work is administrative in all but the smallest police departments. The rare occasions when police chiefs make arrests have drawn media coverage. In 2014, Bernard Hogan-Howe chased a group of fare evaders and made an arrest. A taxi driver had approached Hogan-Howe for help, unaware that he was London's police commissioner. In 2017, Los Angeles Police Department Chief Charlie Beck arrested a police officer on suspicion of a sexual offence.

Canada 
"Chief of police" (French: directeur) is the most common title for the highest-ranked officer in a Canadian police service. The exceptions are: the Royal Canadian Mounted Police (commissioner), Ontario Provincial Police (commissioner), South Coast British Columbia Transportation Authority Police Service (chief officer), Vancouver Police Department (chief constable), West Vancouver Police Department (chief constable), Nelson Police Department (chief constable), Quebec City (director) and the Sûreté du Québec (director general).

In the province of Ontario, a chief of police must be a sworn police officer and therefore have completed training at the Ontario Police College or have served a probationary period with another recognized police force (such as the Royal Canadian Mounted Police's academy known as "Depot"). This requirement is legislated in the Police Services Act of Ontario. The legislation states in section two that a chief of police is a police officer. Section 44.2 of the PSA defines the training requirements. There was a case in the police department of Guelph, Ontario, where a human resource manager was promoted to the position of deputy chief but was required to complete training at the OPC. The candidate is selected by a police services board.

Deputy chief
Ranks below the chief are stylized as deputy chief, deputy chief constable (BC) and deputy commissioner or associate director (Quebec).

Indonesia

In Indonesia, the chief of the National Police of Indonesia is often colloquially dubbed: "Kapolri", an acronym of "Kepala Kepolisian Negara Republik Indonesia" meaning "Head of the National Police of the Republic of Indonesia". He is also a four-star ranking officer in the national police. The National Police Chief is elected by the president based on the approval of the House of Representatives and is directly responsible to the president. Since Indonesia adopts the system of a unified "national police", the chief of the Indonesian National Police holds strong responsibility in policing authorities nationally across Indonesia. The police chief usually conducts strong relations and work together with the Commander of the National Armed Forces. In line with the general features of unified structure of local governments, all chiefs of the Indonesian police, at district level ("kapolsek", kepala kepolisian sektor"), municipal level ("kapolres", kepala kepolisian resor"), and provincial level ("kapolda", kepala kepolisian daerah) in Indonesia, are subordinates of Kapolri, the national police chief.

United Kingdom 

In the United Kingdom, the chief police officer for 43 of the 45 territorial police forces and the three special police forces holds the rank of chief constable. The exceptions are the Metropolitan Police Service and City of London Police, where the chief police officer instead holds the rank of commissioner. The umbrella term for the chief constables and commissioners is "chief police officer". The term "chief officer", by contrast, includes the chief police officers and their deputies and assistants. The National Police Chiefs Council is the association for chief officers.

The rank of commissioner should not be confused with the police and crime commissioners. They are elected officials who oversee a police force and how its funds are spent, rather than being police officers.

United States
Chief of police is the most common title for the head of a local police department. Alternate titles for a chief of police include police commissioner, colonel, police superintendent, police president or police director. In large urban areas, some departments are led by an overseer who is not a sworn officer, usually referred to as a commissioner. The New York City Police Department is one such case, where the police chief (full title: Chief of department) is the most senior sworn officer. A sheriff is the chief of a county law enforcement agency.

Although sheriffs are not usually counted as police chiefs, their agencies usually have the powers and role of a police department. Some sheriffs' agencies are limited to non-policing matters such as courtroom security. The usual difference between a sheriff and a police chief is that sheriffs are elected (except in New York City, Rhode Island and Hawaii) and responsible for a county whereas a police chief manages law enforcement in a city or town and is appointed by its local government. The fraternal organization International Association of Chiefs of Police (IACP) is an organization that many chiefs of police are associated with.

Many state constitutions require every county to have a sheriff; some make no provision for this position to be eliminated even in the case of the formation of a consolidated city–county or "metropolitan government". In this case, a decision must be made about how to divide the powers between the county sheriff and the city's chief of police. The usual compromise allows the chief of police to exercise law enforcement jurisdiction and to give the sheriff and his deputies authority over jails and the serving of civil papers. An alternative and lesser-used solution is to make the office of sheriff a purely ceremonial one. One other solution, an example of which is seen in the case of the Las Vegas Metropolitan Police Department, is to provide for the sheriff to simultaneously serve as the chief of police, thus remaining as the chief law enforcement officer (CLEO) of the county.

The police chief of a small town may be the only paid employee of the police department and have a staff consisting only of volunteers when available. Conversely the police chief of a major city may have thousands or in the case of very large cities such as New York, 35,000 sworn officers. In addition, such a department may have thousands of employees other than police officers, including operators, secretaries, and unsworn peace officers. The qualifications and skills required to be a police chief vary widely. Another important consideration is how overtly a police department is influenced by politics which varies greatly from one jurisdiction to another. Increasingly, all U.S. law enforcement officers including small-town police chiefs and their charges are being required to meet at least minimum levels of professional training.

The rank insignia for the chief of a large or medium-sized department most often consists of three or four gold stars, similar to the insignia of a lieutenant general or general in the army. Smaller departments and state agencies most often consists of silver or gold eagles similar to colonel in the army.

Personnel

See also
 Deputy prime minister
 Deputy governor
 Deputy president
 Prime minister
 Governor
 President
 Chief justice
 Police
 Highway patrol
 Law enforcement
 Law enforcement agency
 Fire chief
 Constable

References

Police ranks